

 
Mount Liebig is an Aboriginal community in the Northern Territory of Australia located about  west of Alice Springs.

It is named after the mountain of the same name.

The 2016 Australian census which was conducted in August 2016 reports that Mount Liebig had 169 people living within its boundaries.

Mount Liebig is located within the federal division of Lingiari, the territory electoral division of Namatjira and the local government area of the MacDonnell Region.

References

Aboriginal communities in the Northern Territory
MacDonnell Region